Fernand Mayembo (born 9 January 1996) is a Congolese professional footballer who plays as a defender for  club Ajaccio. He previously played in Ligue 2 with Grenoble, Chamois Niortais and Le Havre.

Club career
Mayembo played junior football for Melun FC and CS Brétigny, and spent time in the youth team of LB Châteauroux.

Mayembo made his professional debut in Niort's 4–0 win against Auxerre on 29 October 2016, coming on as a substitute for Junior Sambia.

On 26 July 2022, Mayembo signed a two-year contract with Ajaccio.

International career
Mayembo made his debut for the Congo national team in a 1–1 2018 FIFA World Cup qualification tie with Ghana on 1 September 2017.

Career statistics

References

External links
 

1995 births
Living people
Sportspeople from Brazzaville
Republic of the Congo footballers
Association football defenders
Republic of the Congo international footballers
Ligue 1 players
Ligue 2 players
Championnat National players
Chamois Niortais F.C. players
Grenoble Foot 38 players
Le Havre AC players
AC Ajaccio players
Republic of the Congo expatriate footballers
Republic of the Congo expatriate sportspeople in France
Expatriate footballers in France